Senator Stratton may refer to:

Harry O. Stratton (1910–1972), Florida State Senate
Lois Stratton (1927–2020), Washington State Senate